Janet Louise Lunn,  (née Swoboda; December 28, 1928 – June 26, 2017) was a Canadian children's writer.

Early life and education

Lunn was born in Dallas, Texas; she moved with her family to Vermont when she was an infant. In 1938, she moved again to the outskirts of New York City. In 1946, she came to Canada to attend Queen's University and married a fellow student, Richard Lunn. She became a Canadian citizen in 1963. They had five children and her husband died in 1987.

Career
Janet Lunn published her first children's book, Double Spell, in 1968. From 1972 to 1975, she was a children's editor for Clark, Irwin Publishers.

From 1984 to 1985, she was the first children's author to be Chair of the Writers' Union of Canada.

In 1982, she was awarded the Vicky Metcalf Award. She was awarded the Order of Ontario in 1996 and made a Member of the Order of Canada in 1997. She died on June 26, 2017 at age 88.

Selected works
 Double Spell (1968) Twin Spell (U.S. 1969) 
 The Root Cellar (1981)
 Shadow in Hawthorn Bay (1986)
 The Hollow Tree (1997), winner of the 1998 Governor General's Award for English-language children's literature
 A Rebel's Daughter: The 1837 Rebellion Diary of Arabella Stevenson, Toronto, Upper Canada, 1837 (2006) - part of the Dear Canada series
 A Season for Miracles: Twelve Tales of Christmas (various authors) (2006) - part of the Dear Canada series
 The Story of Canada with Christopher Moore and Alan Daniel
 Janet Lunn's story with  Christopher Robin and Whiney the Poo

References

External links

 Archives of Janet Lunn (Janet Lunn fonds, R11768) are held at Library and Archives Canada
 
 

1928 births
2017 deaths
Canadian Anglicans
Canadian children's writers
Members of the Order of Canada
Members of the Order of Ontario
Governor General's Award-winning children's writers
American emigrants to Canada